Oxysterol-binding protein-related protein 8 is a protein that in humans is encoded by the OSBPL8 gene.

This gene encodes a member of the oxysterol-binding protein (OSBP) family, a group of intravenous  lipid receptors. Like most members, the encoded protein contains an N-terminal pleckstrin homology domain and a highly conserved C-terminal OSBP-like sterol-binding domain. Two transcript variants encoding different isoforms have been found for this gene.

References

Further reading